The Liddell Archeological Site is a prehistoric Native American site in Wilcox County, Alabama. It is best known for its Mississippian artifacts, primarily from the Burial Urn Culture period. The site was first documented in the 1960s, when the United States Army Corps of Engineers constructed Millers Ferry Lock and Dam on the Alabama River, creating the William "Bill" Dannelly Reservoir. The Liddell, Stroud, and Hall families donated the site to Auburn University after its discovery. It was added to the National Register of Historic Places on November 17, 1978.

References

Auburn University
South Appalachian Mississippian culture
Archaeological sites in Alabama
Archaeological sites on the National Register of Historic Places in Alabama
National Register of Historic Places in Wilcox County, Alabama
Native American history of Alabama
Former populated places in Alabama
Geography of Wilcox County, Alabama